The 1876 Texas gubernatorial election was held to elect the Governor of Texas. Incumbent Governor Richard Coke was elected to a second term in office over William Chambers, a judge of the First Judicial District.

General election

Candidates
Richard Coke, incumbent Governor (Democratic)
William Chambers, judge of the First Judicial District (Republican)

Results

References

1866
Texas
1876 Texas elections